Jagannathan is and Indian and Sri Lankan name. It derives from Sanskrit and consists of two parts: jagannath (lord of the universe; from jagata = lord and natha = world, universe), and a masculine surfix -an. The name may refer to the following notable people:

Given name
Jagannathan (actor) (1938–2012), Indian actor from Kerala
Jagannathan Kaushik (born 1985), Indian first-class cricketer

Surnale
A. Jagannathan (1935–2012), Indian film director
K. Jagannathan, Indian genetic scientist known for the Bhaskar–Jagannathan syndrome
Ki. Va. Jagannathan (1906–1988), Indian journalist, poet, writer, and folklorist from Tamil Nadu
Krishnammal Jagannathan (born 1926), Indian social service activist from Tamil Nadu
M. Jagannathan, Indian politician from Tamil Nadu
Poorna Jagannathan (born 1972), Tunisian-born U.S. actress and producer
R. Jagannathan, Indian journalist and editor
Ravi Jagannathan, Indian-born U.S. economist and academic
Hansen–Jagannathan bound, a theorem in financial economics
Sahithya Jagannathan (born 1989), Indian fashion model and actor
Sarukkai Jagannathan (1914–1996), Indian banker and International Monetary Fund official

See also
Jagannath
Jagannath Sami
Jai Jagannatha
Jeganathan (1956–1983)
Jogannath

References